Sengers Ladies Cycling Team (UCI Code: SLT) was a women's professional cycling team based in Belgium. Riders for Sengers Ladies Cycling Team competed in the UCI Women's Road World Cup and other elite women's events throughout the world.

History

2012

The 2012 women's road cycling season was the first for the Sengers Ladies Cycling Team.

Team roster

2013

Ages as of 1 January 2013.

2012

Ages as of 1 January 2012.

Major results

2012
Dutch National Record, Olympic Games: London, Team pursuit: 3:20.013, Vera Koedooder (with Ellen van Dijk and Kirsten Wild)
Overall Tour de Bretagne Féminin, Anna van der Breggen
Stages 1, 2 (ITT) & 4,  Anna van der Breggen
Stage 2 (ITT) Tour Féminin en Limousin, Anna van der Breggen
2013
Grand Prix de Dottignies, Vera Koedooder
EPZ Omloop van Borsele, Vera Koedooder
 National Time Trial championships, Christine Majerus
 National Road Race championships, Christine Majerus
Stage 2 (ITT) Tour de Bretagne Féminin, Vera Koedooder
Sparkassen Giro, Christine Majerus
Erondegemse Pijl (Erpe-Mere), Maaike Polspoel
 Mountains classification Lotto–Belisol Belgium Tour||Lotto–Belisol Belgium Tour, Sofie De Vuyst
 Belgian rider classification, Sofie De Vuyst

References

 
Cycling teams based in Belgium
Cycling teams established in 2012
UCI Women's Teams
Cycling teams disestablished in 2013
Defunct cycling teams based in Belgium